Douglas Peak is a  high mountain in the Southern Alps on the South Island of New Zealand. The mountain lies in between the Three-thousanders Mount Haidinger in the south and Glacier Peak northeast. To the west are tributary glaciers of the Fox Glacier, to the east tributaries of the Tasman Glacier.

The mountain's peak forms part of the border between New Zealand's West Coast and Canterbury Regions.

References 

Southern Alps
Douglas Peak
Douglas Peak
Three-thousanders